Supreme Court of India, in its judgement dated 10 July 2013 while disposing the Lily Thomas v. Union of India case (along with Lok Prahari v. Union of India), ruled that any Member of Parliament (MP), Member of the Legislative Assembly (MLA) or Member of a Legislative Council (MLC) who is convicted of a crime and given a minimum of two years' imprisonment, loses membership of the House with immediate effect. This is in contrast to the earlier position, wherein convicted members held on to their seats until they exhausted all judicial remedy in lower, state and supreme court of India. Further, Section 8(4) of the Representation of the People Act, which allowed elected representatives three months to appeal their conviction, was declared unconstitutional by the bench of Justice A. K. Patnaik and Justice S. J. Mukhopadhaya.

Resistance from government 
In an attempt to overturn this decision, the Representation of the People (Second Amendment and Validation) Bill, 2013, was introduced into the Rajya Sabha on 30 August by Law Minister Kapil Sibal; by the proposed amendment, representatives would not be disqualified immediately after conviction. The Indian government also filed a review petition, which the Supreme Court dismissed. On 24 September, a few days before the fodder scam verdict, the government tried to bring the bill into effect as an ordinance. However, Rahul Gandhi, Vice-President of the Indian National Congress, made his opinion of the ordinance clear in a press meeting: "It's complete nonsense. It should be torn up and thrown away." Members of opposition parties claimed that Gandhi's comments indicated total confusion within the government, and called for the resignation of Prime Minister Manmohan Singh. Within 5 days, both the ordinance and the bill were withdrawn on 2 October.

On 1 October 2013, Rasheed Masood became the first MP to lose his membership of parliament under the new guidelines, when he was sentenced to four years' imprisonment for cheating, forgery and corruption.

List of elected representatives disqualified after conviction by a court of law

References 

2013 in India
Supreme Court of India cases

Indian politicians convicted of crimes